Dr Heckle and Mr Jive is the debut album by English band Pigbag, released in 1982 by record label Y. It reached No. 18 on the UK national charts and No. 1 on the UK independent chart.

Reception 

Trouser Press described the band and the album as having "plenty of technical know-how and nothing to say".

Track listing 

2000,1997 Bonus Tracks
"Whoops Goes My Body"
"Sunny Day" (12" Version)
"Another Orangutango" (Remix)
"Papa's Got a Brand New Pigbag" (7")

Personnel
Pigbag
James Johnstone - guitar, alto saxophone, percussion
Simon Underwood - bass, cello, violin
Roger Freeman - percussion, trombone, computer, keyboards, piano, Yamaha 03D digital mixer
Ollie Moore - tenor saxophone, alto clarinet, sanza
Chris Lee - trumpet, percussion
Chip Carpenter - drums, percussion

References

External links 

 

1982 debut albums
Pigbag albums